"Passin' Me By" is a song by American hip-hop group The Pharcyde, released in March 1993 through Delicious Vinyl Records. The song was the second single released from the group's 1992 debut album Bizarre Ride II the Pharcyde. The song, produced by J-Swift, samples "Summer in the City" by Quincy Jones, "125th Street Congress" by Weather Report, and "Are You Experienced?" by The Jimi Hendrix Experience. 

"Passin' Me By" was later sampled by Joe for his number 1 single "Stutter". A popular line from the song, "My dear my dear my dear you do not know me but I know you very well now let me tell you," was repeated in the same manner in "Stutter" (the remix featuring Mystikal)  with the only difference between the lines being that the words "about the feelings I have for you" were changed to "that I caught you" in "Stutter."

The group's four emcees, Bootie Brown, Slimkid3, Imani, and Fatlip recount schoolboy crushes which all eventually led to heartbreak, with the chorus featuring a male vocalist singing, "She keeps on passin' me by" against a soprano saxophone riff. The song peaked at #1 on the Hot Rap Singles, #52 on the Billboard Hot 100, and #28 on the Hot R&B/Hip-Hop Singles & Tracks charts.

Pitchfork included the song at #41 on their Top 200 Tracks of the 90s.

Music video
The music video (directed by Sanji) is shot in black and white. The rappers are seen riding in the back seat of a car or rapping behind a fence. Throughout the video, the group is seen upside-down in comparison to the rest of the world.

Track listing

A-Side 
"Passin' Me By" (Video Remix)
"Passin' Me By" (Video instrumental)
"Passin' Me By" (A capella)

B-Side
"Pork" (Original version)
"Pork" (Cosby edit)
"Pork" (Instrumental)

Other media

The song was featured in the soundtrack for the video game NBA 2K9 as well as in the game Aggressive Inline. An instrumental clip of the song was used in the opening of the 1999 film Big Daddy.
The song was remixed and called "Rinsing Quince" by Aphrodite in 2003.

In the single "Blurred Lines" by Robin Thicke (featuring Pharrell and T.I.), T.I. raps, "In a hundred years, not dare would I / Pull a Pharcyde, let you pass me by."

In 2017, the song was featured in the Netflix Original TV series Atypical in the season one, episode two, titled "A Human Female". 

The song appeared in the FX series Atlanta in the episode "FUBU" (season two, episode ten).  

In January 2019, "Passin' Me By" was featured in the Netflix Original comedy series Friends from College in the episode "Storage Unit" (season two, episode two).  

In October 2018, the song was featured in the film mid90s.

In March 2021, the song was featured in Last Chance U: Basketball, in the first season second episode "Hooper".

in 2022, the song was featured in Kenan, in the second season episode "Moving Violations"

Charts

References

External links

1993 singles
1992 songs
The Pharcyde songs
Music videos directed by Sanji (director)
Black-and-white music videos
Delicious Vinyl singles
Jazz rap songs